Melanocercops desiccata is a moth of the family Gracillariidae. It is known from Bihar, India and from Sri Lanka.

The larvae feed on Ficus glomerata and Ficus racemosa. They probably mine the leaves of their host plant.

References

Acrocercopinae
Moths of Asia
Moths described in 1916